Watinga is a village in the Saponé Department of Bazèga Province in central Burkina Faso. The village has a population of 353.

References

Populated places in the Centre-Sud Region
Bazèga Province